The Greens and Left Alliance (AVS) is a left-wing political alliance active in Italy, which was launched on 2 July 2022 as a federation of two political parties, Italian Left (SI) and Green Europe (EV).

The AVS is often referred to as a red–green alliance and its leader is Angelo Bonelli, spokesperson of EV.

History

Background 
In January 2022, Italian Left (SI) and Green Europe (EV) formed a "consultation pact", aimed at co-operating on the 2022 Italian presidential election held in late January. In that context, the two parties decided to jointly support Luigi Manconi, an expert on human rights issues and former lawmaker for the Federation of the Greens, the Democrats of the Left, and the Democratic Party (PD).

In June 2022, SI's national assembly formally approved the alliance with EV, which did the same in its federal assembly.

In July 2022, SI and EV held a joint convention in Rome named "New Energies", promoting their cooperation and a unitary electoral program. The alliance deliberately took inspiration from the New Ecological and Social People's Union, the left-wing list formed in the run-up of the 2022 French legislative election. Following the fall of Mario Draghi's government, a national unity government that was not supported by SI and EV, the early dissolution of Parliament and the calling of the 2022 Italian general election, the AVS was officially launched and its logo presented. In August 2022, the alliance formalised an electoral agreement with the PD.

Composition

Founding member parties

Associate parties

Regional partners

Electoral results

Italian Parliament

Regional Councils

References

External links 
 Electoral Accord beteween Greens and Left Alliance and the Democratic Party (in Italian)
 Greens and Left Alliance Programme (in Italian)

2022 establishments in Italy
Democratic socialist parties in Europe
Eco-socialism
Green politics
Left-wing political party alliances
Left-wing politics in Italy
Political parties established in 2022
Political party alliances in Italy
Progressive parties